The Hydrofoil Mystery was written in 1999 by Canadian author Eric Walters. It is about a teenage boy named Billy McCracken, whose mother arranges for him to go away for the summer to work with none other than the well-known inventor of the telephone, Alexander Graham Bell. Billy expects his summer to be boring, but with the German U-boats endangering the maritime coast, his work with Bell's hydrofoil becomes an adventure.

The book is set during the first World War and although it is a work of fiction, it serves as a launching pad for discussions about Canada's involvement in the war and the contributions of Canada's leading scientist, Alexander Graham Bell.

1999 Canadian novels
Children's historical novels
Canadian young adult novels
Novels by Eric Walters
Novels set during World War I
1999 children's books

References